Khasim Mirza (born September 14, 1986) is a Filipino professional basketball player for the GenSan Warriors of the Maharlika Pilipinas Basketball League (MPBL).

Born to an Indian father and a Filipina mother, Mirza played for the University of Santo Tomas Growling Tigers in the University Athletic Association of the Philippines for three seasons (2007 to 2009). He then played for the Philippine Patriots in the Asean Basketball League from 2009 to 2010 before being drafted 16th overall in the second round of the 2010 PBA draft by PBA expansion team Meralco Bolts.

References

External links
UST Growling Tigers Player Profiles

1986 births
Living people
Filipino men's basketball players
Filipino people of Indian descent
Philippine Patriots players
UST Growling Tigers basketball players
Small forwards
Meralco Bolts players
Air21 Express players
Maharlika Pilipinas Basketball League players
Meralco Bolts draft picks